Excess is Coma's first English-language album, which was released in Europe on 11 October 2010.
The album consists of nine tracks from Hipertrofia (2008), which were re-recorded in English, and three new songs: "F.T.P." and "F.T.M.O." from the movie Skrzydlate Świnie (where Rogucki played one of the main roles), and "Turn Back The River".
On 1 September 2010, the album was made available to buy in Poland, but only via Mystic Production website.

Track listing

Personnel
Coma
Piotr Rogucki - vocals
Dominik matuszak- guitar
Marcin Kobza - guitar
Rafał Matuszak - bass guitar
Adam Marszałkowski - drums

Charts

References

2010 albums
Coma (band) albums
Mystic Production albums